75 Cygni is a binary star system in the northern constellation of Cygnus. It is visible to the naked eye as a dim, reddish-hued point of light with an apparent visual magnitude of 5.09. The system is located at a distance of about 434 light years from the Sun, based on parallax, and is drifting closer with a radial velocity of −29 km/s.

The brighter magnitude 5.18 primary is an aging red giant star with a stellar classification of M1IIIab. Having exhausted the supply of hydrogen at its core, it has expanded to around 45 times the radius of the Sun. It is a suspected variable star of unknown type and amplitude. The star is radiating 439 times the Sun's luminosity from its enlarged photosphere at an effective temperature of 3,954 K.

An optical companion, with a spectral type of K, is about an arcminute away and has an apparent magnitude of 10.14.

References

M-type giants
Suspected variables
K-type giants
Binary stars

Cygnus (constellation)
Durchmusterung objects
Cygni, 75
206330
106999
8284